In enzymology, a 2-acylglycerol O-acyltransferase is an enzyme that catalyzes the chemical reaction

acyl-CoA + 2-acylglycerol  CoA + diacylglycerol

Thus, the two substrates of this enzyme are acyl-CoA and 2-acylglycerol, whereas its two products are CoA and diacylglycerol.

This enzyme belongs to the family of transferases, specifically those acyltransferases transferring groups other than aminoacyl groups.  The systematic name of this enzyme class is acyl-CoA:2-acylglycerol O-acyltransferase. Other names in common use include acylglycerol palmitoyltransferase, monoglyceride acyltransferase, acyl coenzyme A-monoglyceride acyltransferase, and monoacylglycerol acyltransferase.  This enzyme participates in glycerolipid metabolism.

References

 

EC 2.3.1
Enzymes of unknown structure